Officers' Sports Club Atletik-Slava 1923, Atletik-Slava 23, or simply AS-23, was a Bulgarian army officers' football club based in the capital of Sofia.  

The club colors were black and white and its emblem was a black lion over a white shield. Home ground was what today is the Bulgarian Army Stadium. The club's motto was "Athleticism and Glory."

History

AS-23 was founded on 4 November 1923 following the merger of three Sofia-based football clubs: Officers' Sports Club, Athletic, and Slava.  The club's first chairman was lieutenant colonel Nikola Karagyozov.

During 1930–31 season, the club won the local Sofia division. In the play-offs, AS-23 defeated Etar Veliko Tarnovo 5–0, Sila Yambol 7–0, Napredak Ruse 3–1 and won the final against Shipchenski Sokol 3–0. They managed to do a domestic double, winning the Bulgarian Cup the same year.

In the 1940–41 season, some of the key players of AS-23 were called into the army and the club finished 5th in the Sofia Elite Division, however they won the newly created tournament, the Tsar's Cup, by defeating Napredak Ruse 4–2 in the final. The club experienced financial difficulties during the early 1940s, but the anti-communist Brannik organization provided financial help, while the Ministry of War procured the sports kits, allowing the club to remain afloat.

In November 1944, following the Soviet Army's occupation of Bulgaria, the club was merged with Shipka Sofia and Spartak Poduene to form Chavdar Sofia, which ultimately laid the foundations to what is known today as CSKA Sofia.

Stadium

AS-23's stadium, known as Atletik Park, was at the place of the current Stadion Balgarska Armia. On 27 January 1925, the Municipality of Sofia allotted the club land for the stadium. During the 1930s, AS-23 was officially granted the deed to the facility. In 1944, the grounds were assumed by Chavdar Sofia, and then by the Ministry of Defence.

Honours
Bulgarian State Football Championship:
Champions (1): 1931

Bulgarian Cup:
Winners (1):  1941

References

External links
The fan-made website of AS-23

Association football clubs established in 1923
Association football clubs disestablished in 1944
Defunct football clubs in Bulgaria
Football clubs in Sofia
1923 establishments in Bulgaria
1944 disestablishments in Bulgaria